Addington Robert Peel Venables, D.D. (1827–1876) was an Anglican colonial bishop in the 19th century.

Life
He was the son of Thomas Venables, private secretary to Henry Addington and then Sir Robert Peel, two Prime Ministers who were his godfathers and from whom he took his forenames; his mother Anne King was daughter of John King. He was educated at Eton College. He matriculated at Exeter College, Oxford in 1845, graduating B.A. in 1848. He was consecrated Bishop of Nassau in 1863. He died in post in 1876.

Family
His son, Major Charles John Venables of the Gloucestershire Regiment, served with distinction in the Boer War and was mentioned in despatches, won the Queen's Medal with two clasps and the DSO. He was killed at Gallipoli in 1915.

External links
 Memorial to Addington Robert Peel Venables in St Sepulchre's Cemetery, with biography

Notes

1827 births
1876 deaths
People educated at Eton College
Alumni of Exeter College, Oxford
19th-century Anglican bishops in the Caribbean
Anglican bishops of Nassau